Carlos Patricio Cisternas Tobar (born 27 September 1985) is a Chilean footballer that currently plays for Chilean Segunda División side Rodelindo Román.

International career
He played for Chile in an international friendly match against Cuba on May 16, 2007.

References

External links

1985 births
Living people
People from San Fernando, Chile
People from Colchagua Province
People from O'Higgins Region
Chilean footballers
Chile international footballers
Colo-Colo footballers
Magallanes footballers
Deportes Magallanes footballers
Ñublense footballers
Universidad de Concepción footballers
Puerto Montt footballers
Curicó Unido footballers
Deportes Santa Cruz footballers
Rodelindo Román footballers
Chilean Primera División players
Primera B de Chile players
Segunda División Profesional de Chile players
Association football midfielders